Let Loose Live, premiering on Sunday 29 May 2005, was an hour-long Australian live sketch comedy television programme loosely based on Saturday Night Live. At least two-thirds of each episode's content was broadcast live, requiring a large cast and crew. The show was broadcast on the Seven Network on Sunday nights at 8:30 PM, but was axed after just two episodes due to disappointing ratings. It was not replaced; instead, the Seven Network's regular Sunday night movies returned to the 8.30 slot.

Let Loose Live'''s cancellation was announced the day after the second episode aired. Tim Worner, Seven's programming boss, conceded that it did not live up to expectations despite being strongly promoted. According to OzTAM, 955,000 viewers tuned in to its pilot episode, but then the ratings plummeted almost by a third to 650,000 the following week. Not long after the cancellation, the Seven Network announced plans to reinstate the series during the summer (non-ratings) season, but nothing came of it.

Prior to the show's debut, director Ted Emery (Fast Forward, The Micallef Program, Kath & Kim) remarked in an interview that Let Loose Live'' would either 'soar majestically, or crash and burn'.

Cast
 Peter Moon
 Michael Veitch
 Marg Downey
 Colin Lane
 Dave O'Neil
 Jane Hall
 Andrew Curry
 Paul Calleja
 Queenie van de Zandt
 Kate McLennan
 Sam McMillan
 Julie Eckersley

Ratings

Guest Hosts
 Episode #1 - William McInnes (Sunday 29 May 2005)
 Episode #2 - Tom Williams (Sunday 5 June 2005)
 Episode #3 - Guy Sebastian (Failed to air)

See also
 List of Seven Network programs
 List of Australian television series

References

External links
 
Let Loose Live at the National Film and Sound Archive

Australian television sketch shows
Seven Network original programming
2005 Australian television series debuts
2005 Australian television series endings